Ellen Bernice Wilson (born January 8, 1976 in Salinas, California) is a female judoka from the United States, who won the silver medal in the women's lightweight division (– 57 kg) at the 2003 Pan American Games in Santo Domingo, Dominican Republic. She represented her native country at two consecutive Summer Olympics, starting in 2000 in Sydney, Australia.

References
 sports-reference

1976 births
Living people
American female judoka
Judoka at the 2000 Summer Olympics
Judoka at the 2004 Summer Olympics
Judoka at the 2003 Pan American Games
Olympic judoka of the United States
Sportspeople from Salinas, California
Pan American Games bronze medalists for the United States
Pan American Games medalists in judo
Medalists at the 2003 Pan American Games
21st-century American women